Saint-Lazare is an off-island suburb of Montreal, in southwestern Quebec, Canada in the Regional County Municipality of Vaudreuil-Soulanges.

History
Originally part of the Seigneurie de Vaudreuil in the 18th century, the territory corresponding to Saint-Lazare was considered difficult to farm owing to sandy soil, and remained mostly uninhabited. In 1812, the first settlers were Americans from New England, then circa 1820 English from Cumberland, followed soon after by French Canadians.

Saint-Lazare was founded as a parish municipality on December 29, 1875. The first church was built in 1877, destroyed by a fire in 1942 and subsequently rebuilt in 1947.

A passenger train from Canadian Pacific Railway previously ran through the town but was discontinued in 1960. The station located on the corner of Sainte-Angélique and Duhamel was demolished.

Originally a rural farming town, the city of Saint-Lazare experienced rapid growth in the 1990s, fueled predominantly by the arrival of young, middle-class families. New residents flocked to the area seeking a more relaxed lifestyle than that of the island of Montreal, as well as larger homes and property for less money than on the island of Montreal.

In December 2001, Saint-Lazare changed its statutes and became a city.

In 2015, the Saint-Lazare government began using pictograms instead of text on signs when the Office québécois de la langue française (OQLF) asked it to remove its English-language signs; the Saint-Lazare community believes in accommodating bilingualism and its Anglophone residents.

Communities
Saint-Lazare-de-Vaudreuil
Saint-Lazare-Sud
Saint-Lazare-Nord
Saddlebrook
Sandcastle
Cedarbrook
Sunnybrook
Chanterel
Forest Hill
Maple Ridge

Demographics 

Soils

Saint-Lazare was built on thick deposits of sand. Poorly drained areas are most common in the eastern part of town and have been mapped as muck, Peat or Vaudreuil series (a "half-bog" or gleysol), while the well to rapidly drained classic podzols are assigned to Ste. Sophie or Upland series.

Attractions

Some of the popular attractions are:

 Aéroport Cooper
 Bar Chez Maurice
 Bar Planète St-Lazare
 Club équestre Les Forestiers
 Sports Complex
 Festivals
 Festival équestre Gymkhana
 Horse shows
 La Pinière
 Torchlight Parade (ATV)
 Trails and paths
   Canins canine sport center

Parks

Saint-Lazare is graced by significant public funding for its ambitious recreational projects. Bedard Park in the centre of the town is a relatively large park equipped with a small water park, a grass field, three baseball diamonds, and tennis courts.  In the winter two hockey rinks and an ice skating oval are added. The park hosts several events throughout the year, among the biggest of which is the annual St-Jean-de-Baptiste festival. 
Another large, multi-use park is called Le Parc nature les Forestiers de Saint-Lazare (2800 Chemin Lotbinière, Saint-Lazare, QC J7T 3H9). It is a 4-season park, with an outdoor pool, trails for hiking, cross-country skiing, horse riding, and snowshoeing, and picnic areas.

Other parks in Saint-Lazare are scattered among the small subdivisions throughout the municipality.

A new privately -financed sports centre was opened to the public in 2006 which includes an indoor soccer turf, a hockey rink, and a gym.

Equestrian
Areas surrounding Saint-Lazare are dedicated to equestrian horse riding, including sanctioned trails that flow through wooded forests and nearby lakes in the region. Many trails are sand based, which is due in part to the popularity of this type of activity in the region. The town has one of the largest populations of horses, approximately 3,500 with many residential properties fully dedicated to breeding and horse training.

ATV
All-terrain vehicles are very popular in the region with an officially sanctioned trail, which runs between Saint-Lazare and the nearby town of Rigaud, Quebec. The trail is maintained by regional members of local ATV clubs. The trails are open in all four seasons, and groomed in the winter using heavy machinery.

Transportation
The city is served by the 51 bus from the Exo La Presqu’Île, terminating at the Vaudreuil train station.

Education
Commission Scolaire des Trois-Lacs operates Francophone schools.
 École à l'Orée-du-Bois
 École Auclair
 École des Étriers
 Sections are zoned to École Saint-Thomas in Hudson
There is one French language public high school (École secondaire Cité-des-Jeunes in Vaudreuil-Dorion) in the area.

Lester B. Pearson School Board operates Anglophone schools.
 Birchwood Elementary School
 Evergreen Elementary School
 Forest Hill Elementary School
 A portion is zoned to Mount Pleasant Elementary School in Hudson
 Westwood High School-Junior Campus (the senior campus is in Hudson)

A new senior elementary school, Forest Hill Senior, was opened in 2006. There are also two English language public secondary schools in the surrounding area (Westwood Senior - formerly Hudson High School - and Westwood Junior-formerly known as Vaudreuil Catholic High School).  A new English-language elementary school (Birchwood Elementary) has opened for the 2011–2012 school year, even after many delays in construction.

There is a semi-private French-speaking institution in Rigaud (Collège-Bourget).

See also
 List of cities in Quebec

References

External links

 
 Surrounding area - Hudson, Quebec

Cities and towns in Quebec
Incorporated places in Vaudreuil-Soulanges Regional County Municipality